Serhiy Tkachenko (born 10 February 1979 in Odessa, Ukrainian SSR) is a Ukrainian former footballer.

External links
Statistics at FFU website

Living people
Ukrainian footballers
Ukraine international footballers
1979 births
SC Odesa players
FC Shakhtar Donetsk players
FC Metalurh Donetsk players
FC Chornomorets Odesa players
FC Arsenal Kyiv players
Ukrainian Premier League players
Association football midfielders
Footballers from Odesa